Leeton High School (abbreviated as LHS) is a government-funded co-educational comprehensive secondary day school, located in Leeton in the Riverina region of New South Wales, Australia.

Established in 1926 as Leeton's first high school and is now one of three public secondary schools serving the Leeton Shire, the school enrolled approximately 470 students in 2018, from Year 7 to Year 12, of whom 13 percent identified as Indigenous Australians and nine percent were from a language background other than English. The school is operated by the New South Wales Department of Education; the principal is Meagan Crelley.

History

The school was established on 18 September 1926 as Leeton District School by the Minister for Education, Thomas Mutch.

Raised to the status of Intermediate High School from 1 January 1928, the school was upgraded to a fully comprehensive high school in January 1947.

Significant events
In May 2005, the school was devastated by fire that destroyed the science block. A new state-of-the-art block was opened ahead of schedule in February 2006. In 2007, parts of the school were again devastated by fires. Later in 2007, the school was again devastated by fires, this time destroying the English wing. Work on rebuilding that wing finished in November 2009. There is currently no evidence or official statements to prove if it was arson.

On 5 April 2015, English and drama teacher Stephanie Scott was raped and murdered on the school grounds by janitor Vincent Stanford. Stanford was later convicted of murder, and sentenced to life imprisonment without parole. An amphitheatre was later built in the school as a memorial to her death.

See also 

 List of government schools in New South Wales
 List of schools in the Riverina
 Education in Australia

References

External links

 

Public high schools in New South Wales
Leeton, New South Wales
Educational institutions established in 1926
1926 establishments in Australia
Education in the Riverina